Noël Aubin (23 December 1754 in Tours – 18 August 1835 in Tours) was an 18th/19th-century French bookseller-publisher and playwright.

The son of a waxmaster whose profession he first continued, he was arrested in Tours and released in   then established himself as publisher and bookseller in Paris (1795), working in association with printer-bookseller J.-M. Chevet.

Between 1799 and 1802, he published several comedies under the pen names Desfougerais or Desfougerets and published (1793–1797) and translated (1795–1802) various works, especially by British authors such as James Harrington, William Cooke or Oliver Goldsmith. His own plays were then given at the Théâtre du Vaudeville.

He put an end at his bookselling activity (1814), and returned to Tours where he published, as well in Blois and Loches, several theatre plays. He died in Tours in August 1835.

Works 
1798: Le Rosier, song, music by Émile Deschamps
1799: Le Déménagement du Salon ou le Portrait de Gilles, comédie-parade in 1 act and in comédie en vaudeville, with René de Chazet, François-Pierre-Auguste Léger and Emmanuel Dupaty
1799: Gilles aéronaute, ou L'Amérique n'est pas loin, comédie-parade in 1 act, mingled with vaudevilles, with Armand Gouffé ans Jean-Michel-Pascal Buhan
1799: Les Deux Bluettes, comedy
1800: Chamfortiana, ou Recueil choisi d'anecdotes piquantes et de traits d'esprit de Chamfort
1802: Pannard, clerc de procureur, comédie-vaudeville in 1 act and in prose
1815: Les Avoués en voyage, ou la Méprise, comedy in 2 acts and in prose
1824: L'Ami des pauvres et de son pays, ou l'Ennemi des abus, comedy
1824: La Maladie de l'imagination, peinte par l'homme de la nature, comedy
1824: Les Trois Domiciles, ou le Pauvre rentier, comedy in 2 acts and in prose

Bibliography 
 Joseph-Marie Quérard, La France littéraire, vol.1, 1828, (p. 511)
 Joseph-Marie Quérard, Les supercheries littéraires dévoilées, 1869, (p. 915)

18th-century French dramatists and playwrights
19th-century French dramatists and playwrights
French booksellers
French publishers (people)
1754 births
Businesspeople from Tours, France
1835 deaths
Writers from Tours, France